The Man with Two Faces is the title of:

The Man with Two Faces (1934 film), starring Edward G. Robinson and Mary Astor
The Man with Two Faces (1975 film), a Korean horror movie

See also
Man with Two Faces, a chapter of the Japanese manga Saint Seiya